Milligan is an abandoned settlement in San Bernardino County, California. Milligan is located at 34.2766750, -115.1702567 along Cadiz Road.

History
In the 1930s the Lucky Jim Mine near Milligan produced silver-copper ore which was shipped to Douglas, Arizona for smelting. Located at a railroad siding of the Arizona and California Railroad, almost all traces of the settlement are now gone. An abandoned cemetery is in Milligan with 11 unmarked graves.

References

External links
 Milligan Cemetery at WikiMapia
 Milligan Cemetery at Find a Grave
 Milligan USGS Milligan Quad, California, Topographic Map at TopoZone

Ghost towns in California
Former settlements in San Bernardino County, California